Hiroyuki Suzuki may refer to:

, Japanese yo-yo performer
, Japanese figure skater, ice dancer and skating coach
, Japanese architectural historian